Granada railway station is the main railway station of the Spanish city of Granada, Andalusia.

Services
As of 2019, Granada served by AVE high-speed trains to Madrid and Barcelona, as well as Media Distancia services to Seville-Santa Justa, Algeciras and Almería. Outside the main station building there is a stop on the Granada Metro light rail line 1.

References

Buildings and structures in Granada
Railway stations in Andalusia
Railway stations in Spain opened in 1874